|}

The Chesham Stakes is a Listed flat horse race in Great Britain open to two-year-old horses. It is run at Ascot over a distance of 7 furlongs (1,408 metres), and it is scheduled to take place each year in June.

History
The event is named after the 3rd Baron Chesham, who served as the last Master of the Buckhounds in 1900–01. It was established in 1919, and it was originally contested over 5 furlongs. It replaced a previous race, the first leg of the Triennial Stakes. The race has an unusual restriction, being open only to horses sired by stallions who won over ten furlongs or more.

For a period the Chesham Stakes was contested over 6 furlongs, and it was extended to 7 furlongs in 1996. It is currently restricted to horses whose sires or dams have won at a distance in excess of 1 mile and 1½ furlongs, or in excess of 1,900 metres.

The Chesham Stakes is now the opening race on the final day of the Royal Ascot meeting.

Lester Piggott rode seven winners of the race between 1960 and 1982.

Records
Leading jockey since 1986 (6 wins):
 Ryan Moore - Maybe (2011), Churchill (2016), September (2017), Battleground (2020), Point Lonsdale (2021)

Leading trainer since 1986 (6 wins):
 Aidan O'Brien – Bach (1999), Maybe (2011), Churchill (2016), September (2017), Battleground (2020), Point Lonsdale (2021)

Winners since 1984

See also
 Horse racing in Great Britain
 List of British flat horse races

References

 Paris-Turf:
 Racing Post:

 pedigreequery.com – Chesham Stakes – Ascot.

Flat races in Great Britain
Ascot Racecourse
Flat horse races for two-year-olds
Recurring sporting events established in 1919
1919 establishments in England